The following is a list of notable deaths in October 2018.

Entries for each day are listed alphabetically by surname. A typical entry lists information in the following sequence:
 Name, age, country of citizenship at birth, subsequent country of citizenship (if applicable), reason for notability, cause of death (if known), and reference.

October 2018

1
Shirin Aliabadi, 45, Iranian visual artist, cancer.
Charles Aznavour, 94, French-Armenian singer ("La Bohème", "She"), lyricist and actor (Shoot the Piano Player), complications from pulmonary edema.
Peter C. Bjarkman, 77, American baseball historian and author.
John H. Bryan, 81, American business executive and philanthropist (Millennium Park), CEO of Sara Lee (1975–2001), complications from lung cancer.
Mario Castellazzi, 82, Italian footballer (Spezia, Catania, Livorno).
Caroline Charrière, 57, Swiss composer, conductor and flautist.
Stelvio Cipriani, 81, Italian composer, complications from a stroke.
Ben Daglish, 52, British composer (The Last Ninja), lung cancer.
Đỗ Mười, 101, Vietnamese politician, General Secretary of the Communist Party (1991–1997), Prime Minister (1988–1991), respiratory and kidney failure.
Carlos Ezquerra, 70, Spanish comics artist (Judge Dredd, Preacher, Strontium Dog), lung cancer.
Michael Freedland, 83, British journalist and biographer.
Jerry González, 69, American bandleader and trumpeter, heart attack.
Francesco Greco, 75, Italian politician, Senator (1983–1994).
Darryl Greenamyer, 82, American aviator and record holder.
Ronnie Leitch, 64, Sri Lankan singer and actor (Mother Teresa: In the Name of God's Poor, Re Daniel Dawal Migel, Onna Babo), heart attack.
M. V. V. S. Murthi, 76, Indian academic, businessman and politician, founder of GITAM, MP for Visakhapatnam (1991–1996, 1999–2004), traffic collision.
Donald Read, 88, British historian.
Graciano Rocchigiani, 54, German boxer, WBC (1988–1989) and IBF world champion (1998–2000), traffic collision.
Franco Sar, 84, Italian Olympic decathlete (1960, 1964), heart attack.
Antoine Sfeir, 69, Lebanese journalist and professor.
María Teresa Sosa, 88, Guatemalan politician and activist, First Lady (1982–1983).
Chris Wilkins, 74, South African cricketer (Border, Derbyshire, Natal).
Élaine Zakaïb, 59, Canadian politician, brain cancer.

2
Wendy Atkin, 71, British epidemiologist.
Smilja Avramov, 100, Serbian academic and educator.
Balabhaskar, 40, Indian violinist, composer and record producer, heart attack.
Ron Casey, 89, Australian broadcaster and sports journalist.
Geoff Emerick, 72, English recording engineer (Abbey Road Studios, The Beatles), multi-Grammy winner, heart attack.
Dorothy Hukill, 72, American politician, member of the Florida House of Representatives (2004–2012) and Senate (since 2012), cancer.
Bob Jones, 91, American cartoonist and illustrator, pulmonary fibrosis.
Thampi Kannanthanam, 64, Indian film director (Bhoomiyile Rajakkanmar).
Roman Kartsev, 79, Russian actor (Heart of a Dog, Promised Heaven, Old Hags).
Jamal Khashoggi, 59, Saudi Arabian journalist, strangled.
Józef Kokot, 89, Polish footballer 
Wilhelmus Luxemburg, 89, Dutch mathematician.
Utu Abe Malae, American Samoan businessman, banker and politician.
Cosimo Ennio Masiello, 88, Italian politician, Mayor of Brindisi (1987–1989) and Senator (1992–1994).
Ceri Peach, 78, Welsh geographer.
Hermenegildo Sábat, 85, Uruguayan comic book artist.
José Lorenzo Sartori, 86, Argentine Roman Catholic prelate, Bishop of San Roque de Presidencia Roque Sáenz Peña (1994–2008).
Ole E. Storlien, 83, Norwegian politician.
Burhan Uray, 87, Chinese-Indonesian timber tycoon and philanthropist.

3
Elisabeth Andersen, 98, Dutch actress.
Jiří Bis, 77, Czech politician, Senator (2008–2014).
Julien Bogaert, 94, Belgian Olympic sprint canoeist (1948).
Fang Nanjiang, 75, Chinese novelist and major general of the People's Armed Police.
David M. Fergusson, 74, British-born New Zealand psychologist, lung cancer.
Wen Fong, 88, Chinese-American art historian, leukemia.
Sir Roger Gibbs, 83, British financier.
Heo Su-gyeong, 54, South Korean poet.
Joseph Kamaru, 79, Kenyan benga musician and political activist, complications from Parkinson's disease.
Saak Karapetyan, 58, Russian attorney, Deputy Attorney General, helicopter crash.
Leon M. Lederman, 96, American experimental physicist, Nobel Prize laureate (1988), dementia.
Bent Lorentzen, 83, Danish composer.
Marty Pattin, 75, American baseball player (Milwaukee Brewers, Boston Red Sox, Kansas City Royals).
Hollie Pihl, 90, American judge.
Hugo Raspoet, 77, Belgian singer and guitarist ("Helena", "Evviva Il Papa").
Bror Stefenson, 89, Swedish navy admiral.
Keiichiro Takahara, 87, Japanese businessman, founder of Unicharm.
Antonio Valero, 86, Spanish footballer.
John Von Ohlen, 77, American jazz drummer (Blue Wisp Big Band).
Peter Wales, 89, English cricketer.
Prosper Weil, 92, French lawyer.
Edward E. Williams, 73, American economist.

4
Dave Anderson, 89, American sportswriter (The New York Times), Pulitzer Prize winner (1981).
Jeanne Ashworth, 80, American speed skater, Olympic bronze medalist (1960), pancreatic cancer.
Jack Avina, 89, American college basketball coach (Portland Pilots).
Hamiet Bluiett, 78, American jazz saxophonist, complications from a series of strokes.
Kevin Ellison, 31, American football player (San Diego Chargers, Spokane Shock), traffic collision.
Barrie Frost, 79, New Zealand-born Canadian psychologist and neuroscientist.
Takumi Furukawa, 101, Japanese film director (Season of the Sun, Cruel Gun Story), heart failure.
José Lluis, 80, Spanish Olympic basketball player (1960).
Kurt Malangré, 84, German politician, Lord Mayor of Aachen (1973–1989) and MEP (1979–1999).
Karl Mildenberger, 80, German boxer, European heavyweight champion (1964–1968).
Walter Paine, 95, American journalist and publisher (Valley News).
Bert Romp, 59, Dutch equestrian, Olympic champion (1992), kicked by horse.
José Sacal, 74, Mexican surrealist sculptor.
Neville Sayers, 91, Australian Olympic modern pentathlete (1956, 1960) and sports shooter (1960).
Sir John Swinton, 93, British military officer.
John Tyrrell, 76, British musicologist.
Will Vinton, 70, American animator (The California Raisins, The Adventures of Mark Twain, Return to Oz), Oscar winner (1974), multiple myeloma.
Scott Weir, 65, Scottish cricketer.
Audrey Wells, 58, American film director and screenwriter (Under the Tuscan Sun, The Hate U Give, The Truth About Cats & Dogs), cancer.
Konisi Yabaki, 77, Fijian politician, Minister for Fisheries and Forests (2001–2006).

5
Wayne Berry, 86, American football player (New York Giants).
John Deeble, 87, Australian health economist.
Louis A. DeSimone, 96, American Roman Catholic prelate, Auxiliary Bishop of Philadelphia (1981–1997).
Frank Drum, 87, Australian footballer (Richmond).
Jimmy Duquennoy, 23, Belgian racing cyclist, heart attack.
Ray Galton, 88, British scriptwriter (Hancock's Half Hour, Steptoe and Son), dementia.
Richard Horden, 73, British architect.
Ed Kenney, 85, American singer and actor (Flower Drum Song).
Grigorij Khizhnyak, 44, Ukrainian basketball player (Kyiv, Makedonikos, Dnipro), heart attack.
Herbert Kleber, 84, American psychiatrist.
Lin Xiao, 97, Chinese politician, Chairman of Henan People's Congress.
Greg Marx, 68, American football player (Atlanta Falcons).
Ivar Odnes, 55, Norwegian politician, MP (since 2017), cancer.
Víctor Pey, 103, Spanish-Chilean engineer, counselor of Salvador Allende.
Hege Skjeie, 63, Norwegian political scientist.
Rudy Wowor, 74, Indonesian actor, prostate cancer.

6
Don Askarian, 69, Armenian filmmaker.
John Nicholson Black, 96, British academic and university administrator, Principal of Bedford College, London (1971–1981).
Eef Brouwers, 79, Dutch journalist and spokesman, Director-general of the RVD (1995–2004).
Montserrat Caballé, 85, Spanish opera singer, Grammy winner (1968), gallbladder infection.
Tahir Chaudhry, Pakistani chef, cardiac arrest.
Edwin-Michael Cortez, 66, American library science professor.
James Cowan, 76, Australian author.
Encosta De Lago, 25, Australian racehorse and sire.
Lorna Cooke deVaron, 97, American choral conductor.
Ira Gasman, 76, American playwright and lyricist, heart failure.
Paul James, 87, American sportscaster (Utah Utes, BYU Cougars).
George Kaftan, 90, American basketball player (Boston Celtics).
Quentin Kenihan, 43, Australian disability advocate and actor (Mad Max: Fury Road), asthma attack.
Wilf Malcolm, 84, New Zealand pure mathematician, vice-chancellor of the University of Waikato (1985–1994).
Victoria Marinova, 30, Bulgarian journalist and television presenter, strangled.
Bert Nederlof, 72, Dutch journalist and radio sports commentator.
Ramon Neto da Costa, 31, Brazilian footballer (Figueirense), heart attack.
Robert Pitofsky, 88, American legal scholar.
Don Sandburg, 87, American actor (Bozo's Circus), complications from Alzheimer's disease.
Michel Vovelle, 85, French historian.
Scott Wilson, 76, American actor (The Walking Dead, In Cold Blood, CSI: Crime Scene Investigation), complications from leukemia.

7
René Bouin, 81, French politician, Deputy (2002–2007), Mayor of Chenillé-Changé (1977–2001).
Boris Braun, 98, Croatian professor and Holocaust survivor.
John Gagliardi, 91, American Hall of Fame college football coach (Saint John's Johnnies).
Gibba, 93, Italian animator (Il nano e la strega).
Betty Grissom, 91, American plaintiff winner against NASA contractor.
Brian Hughes, 80, Welsh footballer (Swansea City, Atlanta Chiefs).
Eija Krogerus, 86, Finnish bowler.
Patrice L'Heureux, 46, Canadian boxer, heart attack.
Kurt Leitner, 72, Austrian footballer
Nino Lombardo, 91, Italian politician, Deputy (1976–1994), heart failure.
Peggy McCay, 90, American actress (Days of Our Lives, Love of Life, Murphy's Romance).
Moi-Yo Miller, 104, Australian actress and illusionist, dementia.
Ludo Monset, 72, Belgian politician, Senator (1991–1995), Mayor of Blankenberge (1995–2011).
Peter Nyombi, 64, Ugandan politician, Attorney General (2011–2015), heart failure.
John Odey, 58, Nigerian politician, Minister of Environment (since 2008), cancer.
Moses Olaiya, 82, Nigerian actor, complications from a stroke.
Oleg Pavlov, 48, Russian writer, heart attack.
Marie M. Runyon, 103, American political activist and politician, member of the New York State Assembly (1975–1976).
Natwar Thakkar, 86, Indian social worker.
John Wicks, 65, British singer and songwriter (The Records).
Celeste Yarnall, 74, American actress (Eve, The Mechanic, Star Trek), ovarian cancer.

8
Fernando Albán Salazar, 56, Venezuelan lawyer and politician, Libertador Bolivarian Municipality councilman (since 2012).
Shibly Aziz, 75, Sri Lankan lawyer and politician, Attorney General (1995–1996).
Neville Chamberlain, 78, British Anglican prelate, Bishop of Brechin (1997–2005).
Tim Chandler, 58, American rock bassist (Daniel Amos, The Swirling Eddies, The Choir).
Chris Curran, 44, Australian footballer (Collingwood).
Dina Haroun, 44, Syrian actress (Maraya), lung infection.
Alfred Holland, 91, British-born Australian Anglican bishop.
Juan Heredia Moreno, 76, Spanish footballer (Mallorca).
Arnold Kopelson, 83, American film producer (Platoon, The Fugitive, Seven), Oscar winner (1987).
John Quinn, 85, American theoretical physicist.
Geoff Smith, 76, Australian sprint cyclist, Olympic tandem (1960).
George Taliaferro, 91, American professional (Baltimore Colts) and college Hall of Fame football player (Indiana Hoosiers), first African-American selected in an NFL Draft.
Joseph Tydings, 90, American lawyer (Eisenstadt v. Baird) and politician, U.S. Senator from Maryland (1965–1971).
*Hiroshi Wajima, 70, Japanese sumo yokozuna (Hanakago stable) and professional wrestler (AJPW), throat cancer.
David Wise, 88, American journalist (New York Herald-Tribune), pancreatic cancer.

9
Carolyn Blanchard Allen, 97, American politician, Member of the Wisconsin State Assembly (1963–1970).
Heiki Arike, 53, Estonian politician, Minister of the Interior (1993–1994).
Robert Bausch, 73, American author, multiple myeloma.
Robert W. Cox, 92, Canadian political scientist.
Pat Gorman, 85, British actor (Doctor Who, The Nightmare Man).
Thomas M. Hannigan, 78, American politician, member of the California State Assembly (1978–1996).
Anna Harvey, 74, British fashion editor (Vogue) and stylist (Princess Diana).
Tony Hopper, 42, English footballer (Carlisle United), motor neurone disease.
Diane Jergens, 83, American actress (The Adventures of Ozzie and Harriet, The Bob Cummings Show, Walt Disney's Wonderful World of Color).
George W. Landau, 98, American diplomat.
Larry Larrañaga, 80, American politician, member of the New Mexico House of Representatives (1995–2018), Creutzfeldt-Jacob disease.
Lü Junchang, 53, Chinese palaeontologist (Tongtianlong, Qianzhousaurus, Darwinopterus).
Frank Padavan, 83, American politician, member of the New York Senate (1973–2010), heart attack.
José Santiago, 90, Puerto Rican baseball player (Cleveland Indians, Kansas City Athletics).
Warner Saunders, 83, American news anchor (WMAQ-TV, WBBM-TV).
Werner Scheler, 95, German physician and pharmacologist, president of the East German Academy of Sciences (1979–1990).
Alex Spanos, 95, American real estate developer and football team owner (Los Angeles Chargers), dementia.
Thomas A. Steitz, 78, American biochemist, Nobel Prize laureate (2009), pancreatic cancer.
Venantino Venantini, 88, Italian actor (Seven Deaths in the Cat's Eye, City of the Living Dead, Cannibal Ferox), complications from surgery.
Carolyn Warner, 88, American politician, Arizona Superintendent of Public Instruction (1975–1987).
William Wilbanks, 78, American criminologist.
Roman Zabzaliuk, 58, Ukrainian politician, MP (2006–2014), cancer.

10
Andie Airfix, 72, British graphic designer and album artist (Def Leppard, Metallica).
Malcolm Andrews, 73–74, Australian writer.
Yvan Blot, 70, French politician, MEP (1989–1994).
Louis Brouillard, 97, American Roman Catholic priest.
Achille Cutrera, 89, Italian politician, Senator (1987–1994).
Raymond Danon, 88, French film producer (The Gardener of Argenteuil, Someone Behind the Door, Lovers Like Us).
Denzil Davies, 80, British politician, MP (1970–2005).
Frank Deem, 90, American politician, member of the West Virginia House of Delegates (1954–1962, 1988–1990, since 2014) and Senate (1964–1978, 1994–2010), pneumonia.
Don Eddy, 71, American baseball player (Chicago White Sox), pancreatic cancer.
Laurence Forristal, 87, Irish Roman Catholic prelate, Bishop of Ossory (1981–2007).
Zíbia Gasparetto, 92, Brazilian spiritualist writer, pancreatic cancer.
Theresa Hightower, 64, American jazz singer, colon cancer.
Angelo Marino, 62, Italian art curator.
Mary Midgley, 99, British moral philosopher.
Raye Montague, 83, American naval engineer (Oliver Hazard Perry class), heart failure.
Richard T. Morgan, 66, American politician, member of the North Carolina House of Representatives (1990–2006).
Peter Ramseier, 73, Swiss footballer (Basel, national team).
Bruce N. Whitman, 85, American aviation executive.
Tex Winter, 96, American Hall of Fame basketball coach (Kansas State Wildcats, Chicago Bulls), innovator of the triangle offense.

11
G. D. Agrawal, 86, Indian environmental activist, starvation following hunger strike.
Ireneo A. Amantillo, 83, Filipino Roman Catholic prelate, Auxiliary Bishop of Cagayan de Oro (1976–1978) and Tandag (1978–2001), prostate cancer.
Paul Andreu, 80, French architect (Charles de Gaulle Airport, National Grand Theatre of China).
Fatos Arapi, 89, Albanian poet.
Leif Axmyr, 80, Swedish double murderer.
Marie Bignold, 91, Australian politician, member of the New South Wales Legislative Council (1984–1991).
Charlie Crickmore, 76, English footballer (Hull City, Bournemouth, Notts County).
Robert Dean, 89, American ufologist.
Sir Doug Ellis, 94, English entrepreneur and football club chairman (Aston Villa).
Milton Gendel, 99, American-Italian photographer and art critic (ARTnews).
Carol Hall, 82, American composer and lyricist (The Best Little Whorehouse in Texas), complications from primary progressive aphasia.
Labinot Harbuzi, 32, Swedish footballer (Malmö FF, S.B.V. Excelsior, Gençlerbirliği), heart attack.
Duncan Johnson, 80, Canadian-born British DJ, complications from Parkinson's disease.
Dieter Kemper, 81, German racing cyclist.
Anatoli Levitin, 96, Russian painter and art educator.
Pran Nevile, 95, Indian art historian.
P. Chandrasekhara Rao, 82, Indian jurist.
Yoshito Sengoku, 72, Japanese politician, Minister of Justice (2010–2011), lung cancer.
Engelbert Siebler, 81, German Roman Catholic prelate, Auxiliary Bishop of Munich and Freising (1986–2012).
Jimbo Simpson, 60, Northern Irish paramilitary (UDA), lung cancer.
Greg Stafford, 70, American game designer (White Bear and Red Moon, King of Dragon Pass, HeroQuest).
Hebe Uhart, 81, Argentine writer.

12
Pik Botha, 86, South African politician, Minister of Foreign Affairs (1977–1994).
George Castledine, 72, British nursing educator.
Chang Chun-yen, 81, Taiwanese engineer, President of National Chiao Tung University, member of Academia Sinica, cancer.
Colleen Conway-Welch, 74, American academic administrator (Vanderbilt School of Nursing), Nursing Living Legend, pancreatic cancer.
Rudy Horn, 85, German juggler.
Tom Jago, 93, British liquor executive and distiller, creator of Baileys Irish Cream.
Kim Chang-ho, 49, South Korean mountaineer, fall.
Takehisa Kosugi, 80, Japanese composer and violinist, esophageal cancer.
Pat Leane, 88, Australian athlete, Olympic decathlon (1952 and 1956).
Helen Neville, 72, Canadian-born American psychologist and neuroscientist.
A. G. Russell, 85, American knife maker.
Jan Jakob Tønseth, 71, Norwegian author.
Raymond L. White, 74, American geneticist. (death announced on this date)
Claude Zilberberg, 80, French semiotician.

13
Jockin Arputham, 71, Indian urban planner and social worker.
Jean Bienvenue, 90, Canadian politician.
Fabien Eboussi Boulaga, 84, Cameroonian philosopher.
François Jacques Bussini, 82, French Roman Catholic prelate, Bishop of Amiens (1985–1987).
William Coors, 102, American brewer (Coors Brewing Company).
Annapurna Devi, 91, Indian classical surbahar player.
Robert W. Doran, 73, New Zealand computer scientist.
Edgar S. Harris Jr., 93, American Air Force lieutenant general.
Patricia Hollis, Baroness Hollis of Heigham, 77, British politician.
Sue Hubbell, 83, American author, dementia.
Parithi Ilamvazhuthi, 58, Indian politician, heart attack.
Don Leo Jonathan, 87, American-Canadian Hall of Fame professional wrestler (NWA).
Meher Kabir, 97, Bangladeshi academic and litterateur. 
János Konkoly, 78, Hungarian Olympic diver.
Nikolai Pankin, 69, Russian breaststroke swimmer, Olympic bronze medalist (1968) and swimming coach.
Georgeta Pitica, 88, Romanian table tennis player, world champion (1961).
Gerhard Prinzing, 75, German Olympic alpine skier (1968).
Jim Taylor, 83, American Hall of Fame football player (Green Bay Packers, New Orleans Saints).
Johannes Weertman, 93, American geophysicist.

14
Vicente Almeida d'Eça, 100, Portuguese military officer, Governor of Cape Verde (1974–1975).
Eduardo Arroyo, 81, Spanish painter, set designer and writer.
Enrique Baliño, 90, Uruguayan basketball player, Olympic bronze medalist (1952).
Patrick Baumann, 51, Swiss basketball executive, Secretary General of FIBA (since 2003), heart attack.
Ahmed Boustila, 74, Algerian military officer, Commander of the Gendarmerie Nationale (2000–2015).
Peter Brackley, 67, British football commentator, heart attack.
Robert Bushby, 91, American aircraft designer (Mustang Aeronautics Mustang II).
Tom Delahunty, 83, British-born New Zealand football referee, FIFA list (1969–1984).
Milena Dravić, 78, Serbian actress (Destination Death, Special Treatment, St. George Shoots the Dragon).
Per Theodor Haugen, 86, Norwegian actor (The Pinchcliffe Grand Prix, Støv på hjernen).
Germ Hofma, 93, Dutch footballer (Heerenveen, national team).
Abdulaziz Jassim, 61, Qatari actor.
H. G. Jones, 94, American archivist.
Brian Kinsella, 64, Canadian ice hockey player (Washington Capitals).
Donald Stovel Macdonald, 86, Canadian politician and diplomat, MP (1962–1978), Government House Leader (1968–1970), and High Commissioner in the UK (1988–1991).
R. Burnett Miller, 95, American politician, Mayor of Sacramento, California (1982).
Bengt Harding Olson, 81, Swedish politician, MP (1985–1998).
Mel Ramos, 83, American artist, heart failure.
Valeriy Shmarov, 74, Ukrainian politician, Minister of Defence (1994–1996).
Dick Tinkham, 86, American basketball executive, co-founder of the American Basketball Association, muscular dystrophy.
Wu Zhaonan, 92, Taiwanese xiangsheng comedian, multiple organ failure.

15
Paul Allen, 65, American businessman and sports team owner (Seattle Seahawks, Portland Trail Blazers), co-founder of Microsoft, septic shock.
William Edwin Beckel, 92, Canadian academic administrator, President of University of Lethbridge (1972–1979) and Carleton University (1979–1989).
Cicely Berry, 92, British theatre director and voice coach.
Mario Buatta, 82, American interior designer, pneumonia.
Maximira Figueiredo, 79, Brazilian actress and voice actress, lung cancer.
Shelley Hamlin, 69, American professional golfer, breast cancer.
Eugeniusz Kamiński, 86, Polish actor.
John Knox, 90, British chemist.
Cindy Li, 43, American web designer, cancer.
*Ramón Darío Molina Jaramillo, 83, Colombian Roman Catholic prelate, Bishop of Montería (1984–2001) and Neiva (2001–2012), fall.
Michael H. O'Brien, 64, American politician, member of the Pennsylvania House of Representatives (since 2007), heart attack.
Arto Paasilinna, 76, Finnish novelist (The Year of the Hare), complications from a stroke.
Nancy-Lou Patterson, 89, Canadian artist.
Fernando Serena, 77, Spanish footballer (Real Madrid, Sant Andreu, national team).
Bob Spoo, 80, American football coach (Eastern Illinois Panthers).
Joe Stanka, 87, American baseball player (Chicago White Sox, Nankai Hawks).
William Thompson, 96, American admiral, led development of United States Navy Memorial, complications from cancer.
Jim Wiechers, 74, American professional golfer.

16
Thomas Aisu, 64, Ugandan physician and educator, heart attack.
Ismail Amat, 83, Chinese politician, Chairman of Xinjiang (1979–1985), State Councillor (1993–2003).
Pierre Barlaguet, 86, French football player and manager (Nîmes).
Oleh Bazylevych, 80, Ukrainian football player (Dynamo Kyiv) and manager (national team).
Joseph R. Cistone, 69, American Roman Catholic prelate, Bishop of Saginaw (since 2009), lung cancer.
David Helwig, 80, Canadian poet.
Dave Hill, 80, American baseball player (Kansas City Athletics), cancer.
Dennis Hof, 72, American brothel owner (Moonlite BunnyRanch) and reality show personality (Cathouse: The Series).
Even Hovdhaugen, 77, Norwegian linguist.
Walter Dee Huddleston, 92, American politician, U.S. Senator from Kentucky (1973–1985).
Sid Michaels Kavulich, 62, American sportscaster (WBRE-TV) and politician, member of the Pennsylvania House of Representatives (since 2011), complications from heart surgery.
Ian Kiernan, 78, Australian yachtsman and environmental campaigner (Clean Up Australia), cancer.
Wayne Krenchicki, 64, American baseball player (Cincinnati Reds, Baltimore Orioles).
Berthold Leibinger, 87, German engineer and philanthropist.
Albert Lexie, 76, American philanthropist.
Giovanni Moretti, 94, Italian Roman Catholic prelate, Archbishop of Vartana (since 1971), Apostolic Nuncio (1971–1999).
Paul O'Brien, 64, British chemist.
Dimitar Petrov, 93, Bulgarian film director (Porcupines Are Born Without Bristles, With Children at the Seaside, A Dog in a Drawer).
Siona Shimshi, 79, Israeli artist.
Lidija Sotlar, 89, Slovenian ballerina and teacher.
Margaret Thorsborne, 91, Australian conservationist.
Jacob Weinroth, 71, Israeli lawyer, cancer.
Chuck Wilson, 70, American jazz saxophonist, liver failure.

17
Enrique Bolín, 78, Spanish industrialist and politician, Mayor of Benalmádena (1966–1984, 1984, 1995–2007) and Senator (1986–1989).
Carlos Boloña Behr, 68, Peruvian economist and politician, Minister of Economy and Finance (1991–1993, 2000).
Sebastian Fischer, 90, German actor (The Dragon's Blood).
Valters Frīdenbergs, 30, Latvian singer (Valters and Kaža), contestant in Eurovision Song Contest 2005, cancer.
Leone Frollo, 87, Italian comic book artist (Biancaneve).
Cornelius Gallagher, 97, American politician, member of the U.S. House of Representatives from New Jersey's 13th district (1959–1973).
Ara Güler, 90, Turkish photojournalist, heart attack.
Sir Ngātata Love, 81, New Zealand Māori leader.
Jacques Monory, 94, French painter and filmmaker.
Geoff Scott, 61, English football player (Stoke City, Leicester, Birmingham) and manager, cancer.
Derrick Sherwin, 82, English television producer (Doctor Who, Paul Temple) and actor.
Sir Thomas Thorp, 92, New Zealand jurist, judge of the High Court (1979–1996).
Kōji Tsujitani, 56, Japanese voice actor (Inuyasha, Mobile Suit Gundam 0080: War in the Pocket, The Irresponsible Captain Tylor), stroke.
Fritz Wittmann, 85, German politician, MP (1971–1994, 1996–1998), president of the Federation of Expellees (1994–1998).

18
Elihu Abrahams, 91, American theoretical physicist.
Abdul Raziq Achakzai, 39, Afghan police officer, shot.
Ayub Bachchu, 56, Bangladeshi singer-songwriter (Love Runs Blind), heart attack.
Anthea Bell, 82, British literary translator (Asterix).
Todd Bol, 62, American teacher and public bookcase proponent, creator of Little Free Library, pancreatic cancer.
Dick Cole, 92, American baseball player (Pittsburgh Pirates).
Abdel Rahman Swar al-Dahab, 83, Sudanese military officer and politician, President (1985–1986).
Jeff Hallebone, 89, Australian cricketer.
Randolph Hokanson, 103, American classical pianist.
Danny Leiner, 57, American film director (Harold & Kumar Go to White Castle, Dude, Where's My Car?, The Great New Wonderful), lung cancer.
Li Lianda, 84, Chinese pharmacologist, academician of the Chinese Academy of Engineering.
Judit Magos-Havas, 67, Hungarian table tennis player.
Izumi Maki, 49, Japanese Olympic long-distance runner (1992, 1996), breast cancer.
Åke Ortmark, 89, Swedish radio journalist, author and television presenter.
Hideo Osabe, 84, Japanese author, heart failure.
Lisbeth Palme, 87, Swedish child psychologist and philanthropist.
Dick Slater, 67, American professional wrestler (WCW, WWF, Mid-South).
Darren Stewart, 52, Australian soccer player (Newcastle Breakers, Johor) and manager (Maldives national team).
U Thuzana, 71, Burmese Buddhist monk, leader of the Democratic Karen Buddhist Army (1994–2010).
N. D. Tiwari, 93, Indian politician, Minister of External Affairs (1986–1987) and Finance (1987–1988), multiple organ failure.

19
Werner Cohn, 91–92, German-born Canadian sociologist.
Charles Y. Glock, 99, American sociologist.
Åge Hovengen, 90, Norwegian politician, MP (1977–1989).
Takanobu Hozumi, 87, Japanese actor (The Demon, Mr. Baseball, The X from Outer Space), gallbladder cancer.
Walter Knödel, 92, Austrian mathematician and computer scientist.
Victor Marchetti, 88, American CIA agent and author (The CIA and the Cult of Intelligence), complications from dementia.
Sir John McGrath, 73, New Zealand jurist, judge of the Supreme Court (2005–2015).
Tom Meehan, 92, Australian footballer (St Kilda, Fitzroy).
Dick Modzelewski, 87, American football player (Cleveland Browns, New York Giants).
Tom Neville, 78–79, Irish hurler (Wexford).
Patsy Dan Rodgers, 74, Irish painter and musician, King of Tory.
Osamu Shimomura, 90, Japanese organic chemist, Nobel Prize laureate (2008).
Bhola Singh, 79, Indian politician, MP (since 2014).
Diana Sowle, 88, American actress (Willy Wonka & the Chocolate Factory, Fallout 3, Clear and Present Danger).

20
Jun Ashida, 88, Japanese fashion designer, pneumonia.
Bruno Bertotti, 87, Italian physicist.
Martin Bott, 92, British geologist.
Gaétan Gervais, 74, Canadian historian and author, co-designer of the Franco-Ontarian flag.
Gerard Houlton, 79, English cricketer.
Marie Jepsen, 78, Danish politician, MEP.
Wim Kok, 80, Dutch politician and trade union leader, Prime Minister (1994–2002), heart failure.
Walter Kwok, 68, Hong Kong real estate developer (Sun Hung Kai Properties), complications from a stroke.
Aubrey Manning, 88, English zoologist and broadcaster.
Jon McMurray, 34, Canadian rapper and freeskier, fall.
Ngok Wah, 76, Hong Kong actor (Come Drink with Me, Death Duel, Looking Back in Anger).
P. B. Abdul Razak, 63, Indian politician, MLA (since 2011).
Pedro Luís Guido Scarpa, 93, Italian-born Angolan Roman Catholic prelate, Bishop of Ndalatando (1990–2005).
István Talabos, 62, Hungarian Olympic sports shooter.
Charles Turbiville, 75, American politician, member of the South Dakota House of Representatives (2005–2013, since 2017), stroke.
Peter Velappan, 83, Malaysian football administrator and manager (national team).
Zheng Xiaosong, 59, Chinese politician and diplomat, Director of the Macau Liaison Office (since 2017), Vice-Governor of Fujian Province, fall.

21
Earl Bakken, 94, American pacemaker inventor (Medtronic) and museum founder (Bakken Museum).
Ilie Balaci, 62, Romanian football player (Universitatea Craiova, Dinamo București, national team) and manager, heart attack.
Seymour Crawford, 74, Irish politician, TD for Cavan-Monaghan (1992–2011).
Matityahu Drobles, 87, Israeli politician, Knesset member (1972–1977).
Harry L. Ettlinger, 92, American engineer, member of the Monuments Men, Congressional Gold Medal recipient.
Robert Faurisson, 89, British-born French academic and Holocaust denier.
Dee Hartford, 90, American actress.
John Hill, 68, American football player (New Orleans Saints, New York Giants), pancreatic cancer.
Idris Legbo Kutigi, 78, Nigerian lawyer, Chief Justice (2007–2009).
François Montmaneix, 80, French poet and writer.
Benedetto Vincenzo Nicotra, 85, Italian politician, Deputy (1983–1994).
Jun-ichi Nishizawa, 92, Japanese electrical engineer.
Joachim Rønneberg, 99, Norwegian broadcaster (NRK) and military officer (Commander of Operation Gunnerside).
Harold Stevenson, 89, American painter.
Tan Chin Nam, 92, Malaysian property developer and racehorse owner.
Charles Wang, 74, Chinese-born American software developer (CA Technologies), philanthropist (Smile Train) and sports team owner (New York Islanders), lung cancer.
Eleanor Witcombe, 95, Australian screenwriter (My Brilliant Career, The Getting of Wisdom).

22
Gilberto Benetton, 77, Italian businessman, co-founder of Benetton Group, pneumonia.
Frank Branch, 74, Canadian politician, Speaker (1987–1991) and member (1970–1995) of the Legislative Assembly of New Brunswick, cancer.
Terēzija Broka, 93, Latvian conductor and educator.
Horacio Cardo, 74, Argentine painter and illustrator.
Nikola Čupin, 79, Croatian Olympic rower.
Raymond Fraser, 77, Canadian writer.
Hank Greenwald, 83, American sportscaster (San Francisco Giants).
Boris Kokorev, 59, Russian pistol shooter, Olympic champion (1996).
Mahamadou Djeri Maïga, 46, Malian politician and Azawad separatist.
Sarah Nyendwoha Ntiro, 93, Ugandan educator and activist.
Friedrich Ostermann, 86, German Roman Catholic prelate, Auxiliary Bishop of Münster (1981–2007).
Silvio Palmieri, 60, Canadian composer.
Eugene H. Peterson, 85, American clergyman and biblical scholar.
Milad Petrušić, 85, Yugoslav Olympic hurdler.
Robert Saladrigas, 78, Spanish writer, journalist and literary critic.
Arthur Schnabel, 70, German judoka, Olympic bronze medalist (1984).
José Varacka, 86, Argentine football player (River Plate, national team) and manager (Boca Juniors).

23
Eladio Benítez, 79, Uruguayan footballer (Deportes Temuco, Rangers de Talca, national team).
Skip Campbell, 69, American politician, member of the Florida Senate (1996–2006), mayor of Coral Springs, Florida (since 2014).
Melvin Cohn, 96, American immunologist, co-founder of the Salk Institute.
Daniel Contet, 74, French tennis player.
Tony Hoagland, 64, American poet, pancreatic cancer.
John Hostettler, 93, English author.
James Karen, 94, American actor (Poltergeist, The Return of the Living Dead, Nixon), cardiorespiratory arrest.
Nicola Lapenta, 92, Italian politician, MP (1972–1987), President of the Antimafia Commission (1983).
Mighty Shadow, 77, Trinidadian calypsonian, stroke.
Francisco Nitsche, 87, Chilean footballer.
Louis O'Neill, 93, Canadian writer, professor and politician, MNA (1976–1981).
Rein Põder, 75, Estonian writer and publisher.
Laurens van Ravens, 96, Dutch football referee.
Alojz Rebula, 94, Italian-born Slovenian writer, playwright and essayist.
Todd Reid, 34, Australian tennis player.
Roberto Renzi, 95, Italian cartoonist (Tiramolla, Akim) and journalist.
Rod Rust, 90, American football coach (New England Patriots, Montreal Alouettes).
Max Webb, 101, Polish-born American real estate developer and philanthropist.

24
Carmen Alborch, 70, Spanish feminist, writer and politician, Minister of Culture (1993–1996), cancer.
Dame Beryl Beaurepaire, 95, Australian political activist.
Darijan Božič, 85, Slovenian composer.
Pat Farrelly, 83, Canadian Olympic athlete.
Rudolf Gelbard, 87, Austrian Holocaust survivor.
Anatoly Gladilin, 83, Russian writer.
Keith Hunter, 66, New Zealand marine and freshwater chemist (University of Otago).
John D. Lamond, 71, Australian film director (Australia After Dark, Felicity, Breakfast in Paris), complications from Parkinson's disease.
Na Muthuswamy, 82, Indian theatre artist and playwright.
Michael J. O'Connor, 89, American politician, member of the South Dakota House of Representatives (1971–1972) and Senate (1973–1977, 1981–1982).
Hip Hop Pantsula, 38, South African rapper, suicide by hanging.
Pellegrino Tomaso Ronchi, 88, Italian Roman Catholic prelate, Bishop of Porto-Santa Rufina (1984–1985) and Città di Castello (1991–2007).
Horst Schulze, 97, German actor and opera singer.
Christine Stix-Hackl, 60, Austrian jurist, Advocate General at the European Court of Justice (2000–2006).
Galeai Moaaliitele Tuufuli, 81, American Samoan politician, member of the American Samoa Senate (since 2013).
Benny Valenzuela, 85, Mexican baseball player (St. Louis Cardinals), renal failure.
Wah Wah Watson, 67, American guitarist (The Funk Brothers).
Tony Joe White, 75, American singer-songwriter ("Polk Salad Annie", "Rainy Night in Georgia"), heart attack.
Haider Zaman Khan, 82, Pakistani politician.

25
Sara Anzanello, 38, Italian volleyball player (national team), leukemia.
Cheam Channy, 57, Cambodian politician, MP (1998–2005), brain tumour.
Chen Tiemei, 83, Chinese archaeologist.
Lindon Crow, 85, American football player (New York Giants, Chicago Cardinals, Los Angeles Rams), stroke.
Martin Dalby, 76, Scottish composer.
Sylvia Edwards, 81, American abstract artist.
Sonny Fortune, 79, American jazz saxophonist, stroke.
Ruth Gates, 56, British biologist, brain cancer.
John Taylor Gatto, 82, American author and teacher, heart failure.
Tyrone Gayle, 30, American political campaign staffer, colon cancer.
Thomas Keating, 95, American Trappist monk.
Dorothea Kreß, 94, German Olympic athlete.
Li Yong, 50, Chinese television host (Lucky 52), cancer.
Michael Metcalf, 85, British numismatist, heart attack.
Borislav Pelević, 61, Serbian politician.
Norman Sheil, 86, English racing cyclist.
Shivinder Singh Sidhu, 89, Indian politician, Governor of Meghalaya (2007–2008) and Goa (2008–2011).
Ulysses S. Washington, 98, American college football player (Virginia State) and coach (Delaware State).
Elder Roma Wilson, 107, American gospel harmonica player and singer.
John Ziegler Jr., 84, American ice hockey executive, President of the NHL (1977–1992).

26
Marc Francina, 70, French politician, Deputy (2007–2017), Mayor of Évian-les-Bains (since 2014).
Ana González de Recabarren, 93, Chilean human rights activist.
Warren B. Hamilton, 93, American geologist.
Nikolai Karachentsov, 73, Russian actor (Juno and Avos, The Dog in the Manger, A Man from the Boulevard des Capucines), People's Artist of the RSFSR (1989), kidney failure.
György Károly, 65, Hungarian poet and writer, brain tumor.
Valentin Masengo Mkinda, 77, Congolese Roman Catholic prelate, Bishop of Kabinda (since 1995).
Russ Mobley, 84, American politician, member of the Kentucky General Assembly (2001–2009).
Richard Murunga, 65, Kenyan boxer, Olympic bronze medalist (1972).

27
Angela Bianchini, 97, Italian author and literary critic.
Richard L. Bloch, 89, American businessman and sports team owner (Phoenix Suns).
Daniel Correa Freitas, 24, Brazilian footballer (Botafogo, São Paulo), stabbed.
Perry Lee Dunn, 77, American football player (Atlanta Falcons, Ole Miss Rebels, Dallas Cowboys).
Kyoko Enami, 76, Japanese actress (Gamera vs. Barugon), pulmonary emphysema.
Enrique Granados, 84, Spanish Olympic swimmer (1952).
Freddie Hart, 91, American country musician and songwriter ("Easy Loving", "My Hang-Up Is You", "Got the All Overs for You (All Over Me)"), pneumonia.
Fred Hess, 74, American tenor saxophonist.
Sibtain Kassamali, 55, Kenyan cricketer.
Murray Khouri, 77, New Zealand-Australian clarinetist, complications of heart surgery.
Madan Lal Khurana, 82, Indian politician, Chief Minister of Delhi (1993–1996), Governor of Rajasthan (2004).
Denis Miéville, 72, Swiss mathematician and philosopher.
Antônio Possamai, 89, Brazilian Roman Catholic prelate, Bishop of Ji-Paraná (1983–2007).
Mario Segale, 84, American real estate developer, namesake of Nintendo's Mario.
Ntozake Shange, 70, American poet and playwright (For Colored Girls Who Have Considered Suicide / When the Rainbow Is Enuf).
Vichai Srivaddhanaprabha, 60, Thai duty-free retailer (King Power) and football club owner (Leicester City), helicopter crash.
Yang Ziyuan, 90, Chinese politician, Mayor of Guangzhou (1988–1990).
Todd Youth, 47, American punk and metal guitarist (Warzone, Murphy's Law, Danzig).

28
Anthony Anenih, 85, Nigerian politician, Minister of Works and Housing (1999–2003).
Mick Archer, 75, Irish hurler (St. Finbarr's) and Gaelic footballer (Cork).
Luis Miguel Enciso Recio, 88, Spanish historian and politician, Senator (1977–1982).
Peter Everwine, 88, American poet.
David Fieldhouse, 93, English historian of the British Empire.
Philippe Gildas, 82, French television and radio presenter.
Richard Gill, 76, Australian conductor, colorectal and peritoneal cancer.
I. John Hesselink, 90, American theologian.
Konstantīns Konstantinovs, 40, Latvian powerlifter.
Eldridge M. Moores, 80, American geologist.
Vera Micaelsen, 43, Norwegian journalist and author, cervical cancer.
Erno Polgar, 64, Hungarian writer, heart attack.
Colin Sylvia, 32, Australian footballer (Melbourne, Fremantle), traffic collision.
Bill Trumbo, 79, American college basketball coach, complications from Alzheimer's disease.
Don S. Williams, 80, Canadian actor, director and producer. (The X-Files)

29
Germán Aceros, 80, Colombian football player (national team) and manager.
William F. Bernhard, 93, American cardiovascular surgeon, pneumonia.
Gérald Bloncourt, 91, Haitian painter and photographer.
Peter Brace, 94, British actor and stuntman (Raiders of the Lost Ark, Batman, Highlander).
Bernard Bragg, 90, American actor, co-founder of the National Theatre of the Deaf.
Sir Nigel Broomfield, 81, British diplomat, Ambassador to Germany (1993–1997).
Klaas Bruinsma, 87, Dutch translator.
Dave Duncan, 85, Scottish-born Canadian fantasy and science fiction author (West of January, The Cutting Edge), brain hemorrhage.
Jimmy Farrar, 67, American rock singer (Molly Hatchet, Gator Country), heart attack.
Franco Franchi, 95, Italian racing cyclist.
Lodi Gyari, 69, Tibetan diplomat, liver cancer.
Werner Holzer, 81, American Olympic wrestler.
Mariama Keïta, 72, Nigerien journalist and feminist activist.
Li Xifan, 90, Chinese literary scholar and redologist.
Andrea Manfredi, 26, Italian racing cyclist, plane crash.
M. S. Rajashekar, 75, Indian film director (Dhruva Thare, Hrudaya Hrudaya, Dakota Express), lung infection.
John Roselius, 74, American actor (This Is Your Brain on Drugs, Con Air, JAG).
Larry Snyder, 76, American jockey, cancer.
Tuti Tursilawati, 34, Indonesian housekeeper and killer, executed by beheading.
Wang Guangying, 99, Chinese entrepreneur and politician, founder of China Everbright Group, Vice-Chairman of the National People's Congress.
Young Greatness, 34, American rapper ("Moolah"), shot.

30
David Azulai, 64, Israeli politician, Minister of Religious Services (since 2015), member of the Knesset (1996–2018), cancer.
Whitey Bulger, 89, American gangster (Winter Hill Gang) and convicted murderer, beaten.
Yashwant Dev, 91, Indian poet and composer, pneumonia.
Bill Fischer, 88, American baseball player (Chicago White Sox, Washington Senators, Kansas City Athletics).
María Irene Fornés, 88, Cuban-American playwright (Sarita, Fefu and Her Friends).
Hardy Fox, 73, American composer and musician (The Residents).
Jin Yong, 94, Hong Kong novelist (Demi-Gods and Semi-Devils), essayist and newspaper proprietor (Ming Pao).
Rae Ann Kelsch, 58, American politician, member of the North Dakota House of Representatives (1991–2012), bacterial infection.
Tadeusz Kraus, 86, Czech football player (Sparta Prague, national team) and manager (Aris Limassol).
Frank Litsky, 92, American sports columnist (The New York Times).
Erika Mahringer, 93, Austrian alpine skier, double Olympic bronze medalist (1948).
Beverly McClellan, 49, American singer and reality talent show finalist (The Voice), endometrial  cancer.
Emil Paleček, 88, Czech chemist, discovered nucleic acids electrochemistry.
Rico J. Puno, 65, Filipino pop singer, heart failure.
Sangharakshita, 93, British Buddhist teacher and writer, founder of the Triratna Buddhist Community, pneumonia and sepsis.
Set Them Free, 28, American racehorse.
Götz Schulze, 54, German jurist and judge, heart attack.
Bob Skoronski, 84, American football player (Green Bay Packers), complications from Alzheimer's disease.
Steven L. Zinter, 68, American judge (South Dakota Supreme Court), complications from surgery.

31
Enzo Apicella, 96, Italian cartoonist and designer.
José Araújo, 46, Brazilian footballer (Vitória, FC Porto, Real Zaragoza), heart attack.
Preston Bynum, 79, American politician, member of the Arkansas House of Representatives (1969–1980), heart failure.
Chen Chuangtian, 81, Chinese materials scientist (Academy of Sciences), discovered BBO and LBO.
Louise DeSalvo, 76, American writer and literary scholar, breast cancer.
Colin Edwynn, 85, British actor (Coronation Street, Emmerdale).
Sir Thomas Eichelbaum, 87, German-born New Zealand jurist, Chief Justice (1989–1999).
Johnny Graham, 73, Scottish footballer (Falkirk, Hibernian, Ayr United).
Hou Fusheng, 94, Chinese petroleum engineer, member of the Chinese Academy of Engineering.
Yammie Lam, 55, Hong Kong actress (Witch from Nepal, The Greed of Man, Looking Back in Anger).
Kenny Marks, 67, American Christian music singer, heart attack.
Willie McCovey, 80, American Hall of Fame baseball player (San Francisco Giants, Oakland Athletics, San Diego Padres), infection.
Dana G. Mead, 82, American businessman.
Jack Patera, 85, American football player (Dallas Cowboys, Chicago Cardinals) and coach (Seattle Seahawks), pancreatic cancer.
Teodoro Petkoff, 86, Venezuelan journalist and politician, Minister of the Central Office of Coordination and Planning (1996–1999).
Hamdi Qandil, 82, Egyptian journalist.
Ken Shellito, 78, English football player (Chelsea) and manager.
Roger Bootle-Wilbraham, 7th Baron Skelmersdale, 73, British politician, member of the House of Lords (since 1974).
Mariasilvia Spolato, 83, Italian academic, LGBT activist and author, complications from a stroke.
Tony Streather, 92, British army officer and mountaineer.
Wolfgang Zuckermann, 96, German-born American harpsichord maker and sustainability activist.

References

2018-10
 10